Virsa is an Indo-Pakistani Punjabi-language film revolving around social and cultural values. Most of the films cast and crew were from India. It was directed by Pankaj Batra, with a budget of 40 million rupees.

The film was shot all over Australia. The film stars Pakistani actors Noman Ijaz and Mehreen Raheel, Indian actors Gulshan Grover, Arya Babbar, Kanwaljeet Singh, Aparna Sharma, Aishveryaa Nidhi, Pankaj Batra and Australian actor Andrew Duvall (NIDA Graduate).

Virsa Post Production took place in Pixion Studio. The music is by Jawad Ahmad, with R.A. Krishna as its cinematographer and choreography by Seema Desai and Jasmin Oza. The film was released on 7 May 2010. The film's music director Jawad Ahmad was able to convince the Government of Pakistan's relevant  authorities to waive off the 65 per cent entertainment tax on this Indo-Pak joint venture film.

Plot
Virsa is the story of Nawaz Ali and Ranvir Singh Grewal and their families. Nawaz Ali hails from Lahore in Pakistan and Ranvir Singh Grewal belongs to a village, Jakopur, in Punjab, India. About 20 years ago, both of them migrated to Sydney, Australia, in search of work, where they met and became the best of friends. Gradually, their hard work paid off. Ranvir opened an Indian restaurant, which became a runaway success. Nawaz Ali opened a shop opposite Ranvir's restaurant. It did well and he could manage to lead a comfortable life but he was not as successful as Ranvir.

Nawaz Ali was very grounded in his culture and values and this helped him to remain level-headed and not get carried away by the comforts of life in Australia. He never lost sight of what was morally and ethically right and stood by his Asian values.

On the other hand, Ranvir got carried away by his success. He felt that he was superior to the other Indians and Asians who were not as successful. He found merit in all things associated with the white folks – their lifestyle, their values and culture, their behaviour and mannerisms – and looked down upon his Indian upbringing and values. He had no more use for ethics and morality. He became very conscious of his money, status and reputation.

The difference in outlook and behaviour drive the two friends apart until they reach a point where Ranvir stops talking to Nawaz. However, Nawaz still cares for his friend and tries to keep their friendship alive.

As the film opens, Ranvir and Nawaz are well settled in Australia with their respective families. Nawaz has one son, Amaan Ali and Ranvir has a son, Yuvraj, and a daughter, Meet. Amaan and Yuvraj are roughly the same age and best buddies since childhood, despite the rift between their fathers. However, the difference in the thinkings of the two fathers is reflected in the personalities of their sons.
Amaan is a sensible, level-headed young man. He is strongly grounded in and comfortable with his Asian identity. However, he is contemporary in his outlook. He does a fine balance of sticking to his values even as he adapts to the society around him and its mores and traditions.

Yuvraj is the exact opposite of Amaan. Due to Ranvir's indulgent attitude, Yuvraj grows up to be a rich, spoilt brat. He also feels closer to the white folks than to the Asians around him. He has no idea of Indian culture or values, no ethics and no morals. He loves women, booze, drugs...

Yuvraj's sister, Meet, is quite like him in her values, upbringing and behaviour. She is going steady with a white young man but is not sure how her father will react to this development. However, she also has a special relationship with Amaan. Nothing is said but she instinctively feels that she can always depend on his help, that he will always be there for her. Amaan too feels an instinctive pull towards her but waits for the right time to tell her of his love for her.

Ranvir feels that the people in his village look down upon him because they feel that he is not a good son, since his father, Sardar Joginder Singh, lives here all alone. Sardarji wants to stay in Punjab, till his last breath. Ranvir cons Sardarji into going with him. In Australia, however, things are very different. The cost of living is high and labour is expensive. Ranvir enlists Sardarji's help for his restaurant. Gradually, Sardarji's status becomes no more than that of a paid servant.

One night, at a party, Yuvraj meets Mahi. Mahi has come from Punjab to Sydney for her studies. She is a modern-day young Indian woman, contemporary but with a solid foundation in Indian values and culture. She is beautiful, intelligent and confident. As they fall in love, she tries to reform him and for some time, it seems as though he will sort his life out. But old habits die hard. Yuvraj gradually falls back into his old ways and Mahi is unable to stop him.

Will Ranvir ever see Nawaz's point of view and will they ever be friends again? Will Sardarji remain a prisoner to his son's whims or will he rebel against him and return to Punjab? Will Yuvraj ever understand ethics and morality? Will Mahi return to Yuvraj? Will Ranvir accept a white boyfriend for Meet? And Amaan, who loves Meet – will he ever tell her about his love?
As Virsa answers these and other questions, it makes a strong statement about remaining true to one's values, culture and upbringing even as we constantly adapt and adjust to the society around us. It explores ways of addressing the identity conflicts of immigrant Asians in Western societies so that the succeeding generations can benefit from the best facets of both the cultures.

Main characters
Arya Babbar as Yuvraj Singh Grewal, 20, Ranvir Singh's son. Born in India and brought up in Australia, he has had a completely Westernised upbringing, where he has more in common with his white friends, with whom he hangs out, rather than the other immigrant Indians. Yuvraj is not just Westernised but also completely spoilt. He has enough money and more to throw around and wants to enjoy the good life. He has no aim in life, no goals, no ambitions. Girls, drugs, alcohol, parties are all that interest him. Since Ranvir Singh does not believe in morals and ethics, he has not passed on any values to his son either.
Mehreen Raheel as Mahi Sandhu, a young lady from Chandigarh, is a combination of beauty and brains. She is a modern Indian woman who is contemporary in her outlook and yet traditional where her core values are concerned. She is not overawed by the Australian society and culture. She still respects her traditions and cultures and retains her values of right and wrong. She is also a very emotional person, who values relationships, and sometimes, her emotions lead her to take wrong decisions.
Noman Ijaz as Nawaz Ali, 45, who hails from Lahore, Pakistan. About 20 years ago, he migrated to Sydney, Australia, where he met Ranvir and they became the best of friends. He also opened a store and found moderate success in this venture. Nawaz Ali is very grounded in his culture and has remained in touch with his roots. He visits his friends and family in Lahore every year. He has not got carried away by the comforts of his life in Australia and has not lot sight of his moral and ethical values. He respects his people, his culture and traditions.
Gulshan Grover as Sardar Jogindar Singh, Ranvir Singh's father, a 70-year-old man from a village, Kartarpur, in Punjab. He is a simple, honest, hard working man with a great bonding with his culture and traditions. He has lived all his life in Punjab and wants to spend his last days there too. He is not interested in going to Australia but Ranvir (his son) cons him and takes him to Sydney to live with his family. However, even in Australia, he pines for the smells, sounds and sights of his beloved Punjab. His soul belongs to his homeland and he can never be happy anywhere else.
Kanwaljit Singh as Ranvir Singh Grewal, 45, is a successful restaurant owner in Sydney. He was a simple village boy from Punjab, who came to Australia about 20 years ago and made it big. His success turned his head and he started looking down on his culture and traditions, his people and their values. He felt that he was superior to the other Indians and was more like the white folks around him. He turned his back to Indian values and traditions, beliefs and customs and adopted the Western lifestyle with a vengeance. He started believing that making money is all that matters and ethics and morality have no relevance in today's world.
Aman Dhaliwal as Aaman Ali, Nawaz Ali's son. He is also Yuvraj Singh Grewal's best friend. When Yuvraj is in trouble with his love life, Aaman Ali helps him get close to the girl by helping him think from the cultural perspective.

Soundtrack

References

External links
 

Punjabi-language Indian films
Films set in Lahore
Films set in Sydney
2010 films
Films scored by Jawad Ahmad
2010s Punjabi-language films
Films directed by Pankaj Batra